DCMS may refer to:

 Department for Digital, Culture, Media and Sport, a department of the United Kingdom government, with responsibility for digital policy, culture, media, and sport in England
 Deccan College of Medical Sciences, a medical college in Hyderabad, India
 Distribution Center Management System, in the field of warehousing, logistics and supply chain management
 Desert Christian Middle School, one of the Desert Christian Schools, a middle school in Lancaster, California